Ahare Mon is a 2018 Indian Bengali film directed by Pratim D. Gupta and stars Adil Hussain, Anjan Dutt, Mamata Shankar, Ritwick Chakraborty, Paoli Dam, Parno Mittra and Chitrangada Chakraborty in the lead roles.

Cast 
 Adil Hussain as Purnendu Pahari
 Dev as Dev (Special Appearance)
 Anjan Dutt as Barun Sarkar
 Ritwick Chakraborty as Michael Tendulkar
 Mamata Shankar as Charulata Dutta
 Chitrangada Chakraborty as Titli
 Parno Mittra as Suzie Q
 Paoli Dam as Ramona Chatterjee
 Biswanath Basu as Special appearance
 Kunal Chakraborty as Jayanta
 Akshay Kapoor as Boutique manager

Plot 
A heartwarming collage of inter-connected love stories, Ahare Mon is a romantic drama that revolves around people who are otherwise forbidden to fall in love. Anjan Dutt and Mamata Shankar play two members of an old age home who elope and embark on an adventure of a lifetime. Ritwick and Parno play hustlers who plan and pull off one con job after another. Adil Hussain plays an immigration officer at the airport who comes across a ravishing frequent flyer played by Paoli Dam. Chitrangada Chakraborty plays Titli, a girl fighting a terminal disease but crazily in love with Dev.

Production

Development 

Pratim D. Gupta revealed that he had been wanting to make a love story for a long time but wanted to do something offbeat. He had the airport story idea with him for a long time and later developed the other three stories which can go with the same theme of loneliness, love and companionship. Like his earlier film Shaheb Bibi Golaam, the stories get entwined turning Ahare Mon into one single story.

Casting 
Pratim wrote the characters played by Anjan Dutt, Mamata Shankar, Ritwick Chakraborty, Paoli Dam and Parno Mittra with them in mind having worked with them in Shaheb Bibi Golaam and Maacher Jhol. The film marks the first collaboration between the director and Adil Hussain who agreed to do the film after reading just a couple of pages of the script.  Chitrangada was selected after many rounds of audition for the role of Titli.

Filming 
Shooting for the film started from January 2018.

Critical response
Ahare Mon opened to rave reviews with critics finding the film a heartwarming anthology of delightful love stories.

Shantanu Ray Chaudhuri of Film Companion called the film "the best Bengali film of the year" giving it 4/5 stars. He wrote in his review "What makes the film work is not just how skilfully the director weaves the stories together – that’s a sine qua non-for a film like this – but how he keeps the proceedings intriguing, throwing in a twist every time you least expect it, which gives the film a lightness that belies the core underlying each story: the loneliness of the human condition."

The Times of India gave the film 4/5 writing "It achieves a lot more in this short span of time than most blockbusters do with their bloated scripts."

Music 
The background music for Ahare Mon is composed by "Avijit Kundu" and the songs composed by Neel Dutt. Monta Ahare has been sung by Durnibar Saha and penned by filmmaker Srijit Mukherji while the lyrics of the title track, Ahare Mon, has been written by Srijato and sung by Madhubanti Bagchi. One of the songs has been written and composed by Rabindranath Tagore and sung by Anjan Dutt. The music rights have been acquired by Amara Muzik.

Awards
 Official selection for Hyderabad Bengali Film Festival

References

External links 
 

Indian romantic drama films
Bengali-language Indian films
2010s Bengali-language films
2018 romantic drama films